Brad Gilbert was the defending champion, but did not participate this year.

Johan Kriek won the title, defeating Christian Saceanu 7–6, 3–6, 6–2 in the final.

Seeds

Draw

Finals

Top half

Bottom half

External links
 Main draw

1987 Livingston Open
1987 Grand Prix (tennis)